Australia is a coasting schooner located at Mystic Seaport in Mystic, Connecticut, United States. Australia was built in 1862 in Great South Bay, Long Island, New York and was originally named Alma. Australia was designed to carry freight and to be able to traverse shallow water. Australia was used as a Confederate blockade runner during the American Civil War until she was captured by Union warships and sold at auction. Mystic Seaport acquired her in 1951 for use as a training vessel. In 1962 Australia was hauled out for restoration but damage to the hull was deemed too extensive and the vessel was permanently beached. Australia is now housed in a shed and used as an exhibit on ship construction.

Around December 28, 1874 "Henry Evans, sailor of schr Australia, crashed to death between the tug and vessel at Muskegon." in Michigan.

See also

 List of schooners

External links

References

 

Schooners of the United States
Museum ships in Mystic, Connecticut
1862 ships
Individual sailing vessels
Ships built in New York (state)
Maritime incidents in December 1874
Vessels captured by the United States Navy
Ships preserved in museums
Blockade runners of the American Civil War